There are two Vingtaines du Douet in Jersey

 Vingtaine du Douet (St John) in the parish of St John
 Vingtaine du Douet (St Peter) in the parish of St Peter